The Health and Care Professions Council (HCPC), formerly the Health Professions Council (HPC), is a statutory regulator of over 280,000 professionals from 15 health and care professions in the United Kingdom. The Council reports its main purpose is to protect the public. It does this by setting and maintaining standards of proficiency and conduct for the professions it regulates. Its key functions include approving education and training programmes which health and care professionals must complete before they can register with the HCPC; and maintaining and publishing a Register of health and care providers who meet pre-determined professional requirements and standards of practice.

History
The Health Professions Council was set up in 2003 under the National Health Service Reform and Health Care Professions Act 2002, to replace the Council for Professions Supplementary to Medicine (CPSM).

By 2005, thirteen protected titles were regulated by the HPC: arts therapists; biomedical scientists; chiropodists/podiatrists; clinical scientists; dieticians; occupational therapists; operating department practitioners; orthoptists; paramedics; physiotherapists; prosthetists and orthotists; radiographers; and speech and language therapists.

On 1 August 2012, the organisation took over the regulation of social workers in England from the General Social Care Council. The HPC was renamed the Health and Care Professions Council (HCPC), reflecting its new responsibilities. These changes were made by the UK Government as part of the Health and Social Care Act 2012. The strap line that they use was also changed to "Regulating health, psychological and social work professionals" which was considered better suited to describe the diversity of professionals that they regulate. The HCPC has also reported it was being accorded new powers to set up voluntary registers for unregulated professions or related professions, including students seeking to enter a regulated or unregulated profession or related occupation.

The work of the HCPC and other health professions regulators in the UK (the General Medical Council, Nursing and Midwifery Council, General Dental Council, etc.) is overseen by the Professional Standards Authority.

On 2 December 2019, the regulation of social workers in England was transferred to a new body, Social Work England.

Professions regulated by the HCPC
The HCPC regulates 15 categories of health and care professionals. They are:

All these professions have at least one designated title that is protected by law, including those shown above. Anyone using these titles must be registered with the HCPC. It is a criminal offence for someone to claim that they are registered with the HCPC when they are not, or to use a protected title that they are not entitled to use.

Maintaining standards 

If a professional who is registered with them does not meet the standards which are set, the HCPC can take action which might include stopping an individual from practising.

Other UK healthcare regulators 

The Professional Standards Authority for Health and Social Care (PSA) is an independent body accountable to the UK Parliament, which promotes the health and well-being of the public and oversees the nine UK healthcare regulators. These are:

 General Medical Council 
 Nursing and Midwifery Council
 General Dental Council
 General Pharmaceutical Council
 General Optical Council
 General Chiropractic Council
 General Osteopathic Council
 Pharmaceutical Society of Northern Ireland
 Health and Care Professions Council

Controversy 
In 2016, via a Freedom of Information request it was revealed that despite increasing registration costs for healthcare professionals, the HCPC spent over £17,000 on their Christmas party. For 224 attendees, the cost-per-head for one meal was £76.12, comparable to the yearly registration costs for many workers.

After the registration of social workers was transferred to Social Work England, the HCPC's registrants fell by approximately 100,000; the new total of 281,000 represented a fall of around 26%. Despite their workload decreasing, it was found through an FOI request in 2020 that the HCPC had not made any redundancies in their organisation and were increasing registration costs.

After the number of international applications for registration increased in 2021, the HCPC was criticised for the increasing length of time taken to process these applications. The Professional Standards Authority for Health and Social Care, which oversees the HCPC, reported that by mid-2022 the median time for the HCPC to reach a first decision on international applications was over 90 weeks. The PSA considered that this was serious, "given that the delays could seriously affect applicants and aggravate workforce shortages in the NHS".

See also
 Allied health professions
 Occupational therapy in the United Kingdom

References

External links

2003 establishments in the United Kingdom
Government agencies established in 2003
Health in the London Borough of Lambeth
Medical and health regulators
Medical regulation in the United Kingdom
Organisations based in the London Borough of Lambeth
Regulators of the United Kingdom
Social care in the United Kingdom